Deal or No Deal is a British game show, hosted by Noel Edmonds, which aired from 31 October 2005 to 23 December 2016 on Channel 4. Based on the original Netherlands format of the game show, each episode sees a contestant choosing one of 22 boxes, each containing a cash amount between 1p to £250,000, and then attempting to win as much as possible either by gambling on having a high amount in their chosen box, or making the game's hidden operator, named "the Banker", offer a considerable cash sum for their box regardless of what is inside. The amount a contestant wins is determined by pure luck –  cash amounts are randomly allocated to each of the boxes before each game, with contestants required to open a specific number of boxes per round of the game to eliminate the cash amounts their chosen box does not contain, in turn affecting how much is offered by the Banker. Games always end with the player opening all of the boxes, including their own, regardless of how they intend to make money.

Throughout its broadcast, the programme was regularly aired daily – for its first eight series, the show was aired six days a week for a year, with breaks in production between July and August – with a number of episodes given special themes to coincide with national holidays such as Christmas and Halloween – such special editions included special features and prizes, and sometimes an increase in cash amounts on offer. In addition, the show also showcased a series of special celebrity editions, including a special 10th anniversary edition on 18 September 2015 in which Edmonds played the game himself.

On 19 August 2016, Channel 4 axed Deal or No Deal after thirteen series, ending the game show with a special Deal or No Deal on Tour series across the United Kingdom, with the programme officially concluding after 11 years on 23 December 2016. In October 2022, it was reported that ITV will be piloting a revived version of the show. Two pilot episodes were filmed at Dock10 studios on 1 December 2022.

On 20 January 2023, ITV confirmed that a new series consisting of 20 episodes would air in mid/late 2023, with Stephen Mulhern taking over from Noel Edmonds as host.

Gameplay
Contestants can win prize money ranging from between 1p and £250,000, and potentially £500,000 (after changes made in 2014). The game is played using 22 sealed red boxes, each with an identifying number from 1 to 22 displayed on the front. Inside each box is a sum of money. All the boxes are sealed by an independent adjudicator; the value inside each box is not known to anyone except the adjudicator.

At the start of each game one of the 22 contestants, each standing behind one of the red boxes, is selected to be the contestant for that episode. The contestants themselves do not know who is to take the seat until it is revealed at the beginning of the show. The contestant's box contains their (potential) prize. One at a time, the contestant chooses one of the 21 boxes remaining (other than their own) to be opened, eliminating the value inside it from the list of possible amounts in the contestant's box (displayed on a large screen opposite them). It is in the contestant's interest to uncover smaller amounts of money, in the hope that their prize is a larger amount or that they can get a higher offer from the Banker. Boxes are opened by the remaining 21 contestants; these contestants are also regularly spoken to by Edmonds and the contestant, and offer support and advice. These contestants return for the following episodes, along with a new contestant replacing the previous episode's contestant, so that all contestants eventually play the game. This provides continuity between shows.

There are six rounds: in the opening round five boxes are opened, then three in each subsequent round. After the required number of boxes have been opened in a round, the Banker offers to buy the contestant's box. The amount is dependent on the remaining box values: if several larger amounts are gone, the offer is likely to be low, as the probability is higher that the contestant's box contains a small amount of money. Occasionally, the first offer (or on very rare occasions a later offer) has been replaced by an offer to the contestant to swap their box for one of the remaining unopened boxes. The first offer can also be used by the Banker to offer non-monetary items, however they are rarely taken.

Edmonds tells the contestant the offer and asks the eponymous question. The contestant responds either "deal" or "no deal". Responding with "deal" means the contestant agrees to sell the box for the amount of money offered, relinquishing the prize in their box. The game is now over, though play continues to show the hypothetical outcome had the contestant not dealt. Saying "no deal" means the contestant keeps their box, and proceeds to the next round, again hoping to reveal small amounts in the remaining boxes.

After six rounds, only two boxes remain. If the contestant rejects the final offer, they take the prize contained in their box. The Banker might offer the opportunity for the contestant to swap their box with the other remaining unopened box and take the prize contained in it instead. If the £250,000 remained in the game the swap was automatically offered to the contestant. Dealing early in the game can sometimes warrant the Banker to ask for the money back in exchange for the contents of one of the remaining two boxes. The "Banker's Gamble" is usually only ever offered under the circumstances in which the Banker has originally offered a significant sum of money and the player's last two monetary sums are an extreme contrast (e.g. 1p and £250,000 together). If the contestant agrees to the Banker's Gamble, they are returned to "live play" and their box (or if they have swapped, the swapped box) is opened. They then win the amount in the corresponding box. 

Sometimes there are extra twists to the game, such as making offers between rounds, offering other gambles such as "double or nothing", where after the contestant has dealt, they have to open extra boxes and risk winning nothing or doubling their winnings. The Banker has also allowed the contestant to go ahead one box at a time (giving them more freedom to pull out of the game when they wish). The Banker has been known to try other tricks such as offering prize money to other people, for example, a friend of a contestant who won only a small amount in their own game. Such twists happened rarely, but happened more regularly during the themed weeks.

Game board
There are 22 cash prizes contained in the boxes on the programme. These cash prizes range from 1p to £250,000.  The highest five valued boxes are referred to as the "Power Five", whilst the lowest five valued boxes are referred to as the "Banker's Power Five".

2014 changes

Box 23
On 1 January 2014, a new feature, "Box 23" was introduced. At the end of a game, the contestant is asked if they want to buy Box 23 for the amount already won on the show. The box contains one of five cards:
Double
+£10,000
Money Back
Half
Nothing

If purchased, the result can double the contestant's winnings (raising the highest possible win to £500,000), add £10,000 to their winnings, return the winnings, halve the winnings, or expunge the winnings. This change effectively makes it possible for a contestant to leave with nothing at all: previously, a player usually left with a minimum of one penny. During special theme shows, the contents of Box 23 are modified, swapping out the "+£10,000" prize for "+£20,000" and the "Half" prize for "Quarter".

Offer Button
Starting 29 September 2014, a new gameplay element, the "Offer Button," was added. The button, situated on the contestant's desk, may only be used one time during the contestant's game. When it is pressed, the Banker must make an offer at that point, regardless of how many boxes have been opened at that stage.

The Offer Button becomes available after the opening five boxes are selected. To be able to make use of it during their game, the contestant must correctly guess, within a margin of 10%, the banker's opening offer. The Banker's offer is written and sealed in a capsule and sent to the studio before the contestant guesses the amount. On special themed shows, the contestant additionally wins a holiday if their guess is within the margin.

Top prize winners
Nine contestants have won the £250,000 top prize. All winners of the top prize (as well as certain non-top prize winners) are allowed to keep their box. When the £250,000 was won by the contestant, colorful confetti dropped down on the dream factory.

Production

Deal or No Deal was produced by Endemol and supported by BBC Studios and Post Production, a commercial subsidiary of the BBC. The original studio set for the show was converted from an old paintworks factory and its associated warehouses in Bristol.

Endemol officially announced that they would bringing the franchise to the UK in August 2005 with Channel 4 as broadcaster. Channel 4 initially commissioned a run of 66 episodes, with filming beginning in October 2005. The first episode was broadcast on 31 October that year. Channel 4 then commissioned a second filming period at the end of 2005.

By May 2006, episodes were being filmed Monday to Friday at a rate of 15 episodes a week. Three episodes were recorded in a day in two sessions, one edition in the afternoon using one audience, and then two episodes filmed in the evening using a different audience. The studio operated from 9am to 10pm.

Having initially begun filming episodes just a few weeks in advance, each new period of filming then began several months in advance, and at a rate of 15 episodes a week being filmed, the delay between filming and broadcast varies; it can be months between the filming date and broadcast date for a particular episode.

For a two-week period starting on 10 October 2011, live episodes of the show were broadcast in place of the routine pre-recorded episodes.

In October 2013, production moved to the Bottle Yard Studios, Bristol, which had been custom built to house the show. Filming for series 10 began on 28 October 2013 at the new location.

Participants
The game show participants comprise the host Noel Edmonds, the unseen character of the Banker, the main contestant playing that day's game, the other 21 contestants, and a studio audience. Audience members are commonly asked for opinions on whether the contestant should "Deal or No Deal".

The contestants who appear on Deal or No Deal come from all backgrounds and age groups. The oldest contestant to have played the game was 97-year-old Chelsea Pensioner Joe Britton, who played in April 2009. Britton won £20,000 and gave all the money away. He died in October 2014, aged 103. Contestants who appeared and later went on to fame include 2009 X Factor runner-up Olly Murs, who won £10, and Shahid Khan, known as Naughty Boy, who won £44,000.

The Observer interviewed Edmonds in relation to the show on 29 January 2006, quoting Edmonds as saying that his scenes with the Banker bring out his "inner actor". He revealed his passion for the show and his admiration for the individual community spirit within it, as well as his (later fulfilled) ambition that it would eventually hold a Saturday evening prime time slot.

The Banker
The Banker is the name given to the show's quasi-fictional antagonist. Notionally, the money on the game board is the Banker's own. As such, his role is to make cash offers to buy the contestant's chosen box rather than allowing them to continue and risk them winning much more. The Banker is played by "Himself", as stated in the end credits. He talks to Edmonds via the Bakelite telephone on the contestant's desk, and also regularly talks to the player.

As Broadcast magazine noted in March 2006, the UK version of the show was the first to exploit the potential for the Banker to be an active character. Despite not being seen or heard on screen, this personification led to a high degree of public and media interest. The Guardian newspaper called the Banker "a cult character in the making and no mistake" and included him in their hotlist. Television programmes such as Harry Hill's TV Burp, GMTV, Richard & Judy and Dead Ringers all made jokes about and regularly speculated as to the Banker's real identity. As the show progressed, the Banker's fictitious back story has been built up through the character's conversations with Edmonds and the daily contestants. Edmonds describes the Banker as an older man, who is overweight and has little hair. The Banker has made several references to his six ex-wives, mother, two boxer dogs and also to his estranged son, to whom he never speaks on account of his being a charity worker.

On several occasions the Banker's voice can be heard. He has been heard laughing maniacally, blowing kisses and imitating Basil Brush. Contestants have described his voice as sounding like "a dirty phone call", old and sexy, rather like well spoken deep voiced fellow contestant Lance and "the Scream man". Edmonds has often imitated the Banker's voice in a deep Churchillian tone. Short utterances or other audio from the Banker's end of the phone call can occasionally be heard by the viewer.

Some sources have speculated that the Banker is really former Coronation Street actor and host of The Mole, Glenn Hugill, who works as part of the show's production team. Edmonds denied these claims in Heat magazine in July 2006. However, in 2015, these claims were later proven to be accurate by Richard Osman and Stephen Mulhern, who confirmed that Hugill is the Banker.

Episodes
Episodes of Deal or No Deal were pre-recorded. The show was broadcast mid afternoon (usually 4pm) six days a week throughout the year (with a month long break in July/August that was ultimately dropped in 2012). Sunday editions ceased broadcast on 17 October 2014.  While Deal or No Deal had a standard theme for most of the year, it also broadcast several special episodes usually themed to particular events or national public holidays such as Christmas and Easter. These were stopped before the filming of the 2015 episodes due to Channel 4 Racing misinforming the show of when they would broadcast, resulting in the programme not knowing when their episodes would actually air. Consequently, "Double Trouble" specials substituted the regular specials, in which two people play the game. These games were not in sequence with the regular show.

The show was put on hiatus for a two-month period in July 2015 (returning in September), and for six months in April 2016. It returned to screens in October 2016 to conclude its studio based run, which ended on 11 December 2016. The special "Deal or No Deal On Tour" episodes aired from 12 to 23 December 2016, officially bringing Deal or No Deal to an end.

However, on 20 January 2023, ITV confirmed it was reviving the series and would air a new series consisting of 20 episodes at some point in mid/late 2023, with Stephen Mulhern taking over from Noel Edmonds as host.

Transmissions

Episodes have been broadcast as follows:

Special episodes and Double Trouble episodes
Many seasonal episodes of Deal or No Deal have aired, with themes including Halloween, Guy Fawkes Night, Christmas, Valentine's Day/Love week, Easter and the Banker's Birthday week and Summer specials. Many special episodes have themed games that can be played at the 5-box stage, where the contestant may be able to win a holiday. Games may also allow the contestant to receive an offer after every box opened or allow the Banker to look inside a number of contestant's boxes.
From 2015, due to the show's inconsistent scheduling, the seasonal episode format was retired, with the show instead featuring "Double Trouble" episodes, where two related contestants played together. An addition added in this format is the "Banker's Breakup Quiz", where the pair were questioned about each other.

Celebrity Deal or No Deal
On 8 April 2012, Deal or No Deal started broadcasting celebrity editions of the show. These episodes saw famous faces playing for charity. 

The celebrity contestants (in order of broadcast) were:

Phone-in competition
When Deal Or No Deal began, viewers were invited to phone in (at a premium rate), use the Channel 4 website or enter by post (free of charge) to enter the competition, in which an audience member selects one of three boxes (coloured blue and separate from the boxes used in the main game), and a selected entrant wins the amount of money displayed in that box. The amounts on offer in the competition varied from day to day, but typically comprised two amounts in the low thousands of pounds and a top prize of £10,000 or more. Previously, the competition was only open for the duration of the show, with the box containing the prize being opened at the end of the show, and the winner's name announced thereafter. This was changed from the third Season in August 2007, following the premium-rate services operator ICSTIS imposing a £30,000 fine on iTouch, the company responsible for running the competition. It ruled that the competition was misleading since the impression was given that entrants stood a chance of winning any of the three amounts contained in the blue viewers' boxes, whereas in fact since the programme is pre-recorded, by the time of broadcast only one prize amount is possible. The altered format of the competition only opened the competition after the prize amount had been chosen.

Channel 4 had announced that, following a spate of revelations of improper conduct regarding premium-rate phone services across British television programmes (notably on "Richard & Judy"), it was scrapping all premium-rate phone competitions, with the single exception of Deal or No Deal, with profits from the viewer's competition going to charity. As of 1 October 2007, the viewer's competition had ended.

From 2014, the viewer's competition returned in an altered form. A suite of prizes were on offer (usually for a week at a time) and viewers were invited to phone in (on a premium rate number), text (on a premium rate number) or enter for free on their website. The entrant was required to answer a question using the usual multiple choice format. This ended in July 2015.

Reception

Critical reception
In a review by columnist A. A. Gill, Deal or No Deal was described as "like putting heroin in your TV remote". Guardian television reviewer Charlie Brooker criticised the in-show implication that there are strategies that can be employed and pointed out that the game premise revolves around plain guessing while calling it "a gameshow based on the Copenhagen interpretation of quantum mechanics".

Awards and nominations
Deal or No Deal had consistently been the most watched programme in its slot for all UK channels for both daytime and primetime, particularly in the early years of its run. It was named "Daytime Programme of the Year" at the Royal Television Society Awards on 14 March 2006, and "Best Daytime Programme" in the TV Quick Awards on 5 September 2006. The UK version also won the Rose d'Or award for "Best Game Show" at the 2006 Lucerne Television Festival. Edmonds was also nominated in the "Best Entertainment Performance" category at the 2006 BAFTA Television Awards.
The show was voted "Best Daytime Programme" at the 2006 National Television Awards. Edmonds was also nominated for "Best Entertainment Presenter" at the same awards.

, the show had given away more than £40,000,000 of prize money.

Sponsorship
The programme had numerous sponsors during its run, including Müller, BT, Jackpotjoy.com, More Than.com, Anadin, The Famous Grouse, All-Bran and HSL.

Product placement
In August 2012, the show had undertaken product placement by incorporating the PG Tips logo into its episodes. The logo was added digitally in post-production and appears on the contestants' coffee mugs.

Merchandising

Books
A book called Can You Beat the Banker? was released on 25 May 2006, which has descriptions of games from early episodes and the reader having to guess what the Banker's offers will be, and whether to "Deal" or "No Deal". Drumond Park have also released electronic and board games.

The Official Behind the Scenes Guide was published on 26 October 2006, written by Noel and Charlotte Edmonds, Jane Phillimore, Richard Hague and Glenn Hugill. It features interviews with Edmonds, the Banker, and contestants, and has statistics for all contestants' games from season 1.

Games

DVD games
Channel 4 DVD released a DVD TV game on 13 November 2006. The game is filmed in the show's original studio featuring Edmonds as the host and features 21 contestants from Season 1 playing themselves, who open the boxes and give the contestant advice. The game's three modes are Single Contestant (played like the show), Contestant Vs Contestant (two contestants play rounds in turn), and Contestant Vs Banker (one contestant is the contestant, the other is the Banker, and gives offers to the contestant).

A second DVD game called "Family Challenge" was released on 19 November 2007, which featured 22 contestants from Season 2.

Video games
Mindscape published a video game for the Nintendo DS in November 2007, developed by Gravity-i. It is not the same game as the US version, although sharing the same developer as the respective PC version. A PC title developed by Oak Systems Leisure Software was also released in the same month.

A second Nintendo game, titled "The Banker is Back" was released for the Wii and Nintendo DS in November 2008. The DS title plays similar to the first version, although with more improved graphics.

Tabletop Games
Drumond Park secured licensing rights to the series from Endemol in 2006 to produce table-top games with the license. The company has released a board game, card game, electronic LED game, among others.

The Card game is played somewhat differently from the show - the 22 sums of money are shuffled, and placed on top of the 22 box numbers. The gameplay is similar to the Contestant Vs Banker mode on the DVD with one contestant being the contestant and another the Banker. Contestants then swap roles, and the one who takes more money is declared the winner. The card game is often sold in a special box-set alongside the DVD game. A Deal or No Deal chocolate game is also available.

Other
An online version was available on the website WeDigTV.com; and there is also a Facebook application called "Deal Or No Deal LIVE!", in which a user can play with other people competing to get the highest amount out of the box. The contestant can build up through levels. There is also a chat function whilst playing. A quiz-based Deal or No Deal game also appears on a number of pub quiz machines.

A quiz mobile app titled Deal or No Deal – Noel's Quiz was released on 12 March 2015. The app was available on iOS and Android.

Gambling issues
In March 2012, with the series approaching its 2,000th episode and the format now broadcast in over 50 countries, senior Channel 4 executives were to meet with the Gambling Commission, who were preparing to issue new guidance in April 2012 on the implications of the Gambling Act 2005 for broadcasters and according to The Guardian, had concerns with the show. The newspaper claimed the show could be breaking the law as it did not involve any element of skill, with such non-skill games played for profit requiring a gambling licence.

Reboot
In October 2022; it has been reported that the reboot is being developed for ITV in its 'early stages' with Stephen Mulhern in favour to host the new iteration & the reboot will premiere in mid/late 2023.

Notes and references

References

External links
Deal or No Deal UK – official UK Endemol site
Deal or No Deal – official international Endemol site

2005 British television series debuts
2016 British television series endings
2000s British game shows
2010s British game shows
Channel 4 game shows
British television series based on Dutch television series
British television series revived after cancellation
UK
English-language television shows
Television series by Banijay